Mara (also Romanized as Marā‘) is a village in Khabar Rural District, Dehaj District, Shahr-e Babak County, Kerman Province, Iran. According to the 2006 census, the population is 149, in 25 families.

References 

Populated places in Shahr-e Babak County